Émile Gretsch (12 August 1908 – 17 July 2004) was a Luxembourgian épée and foil fencer. He competed at the 1948, 1952 and 1956 Summer Olympics.

References

External links
 

1908 births
2004 deaths
People from Echternach
Luxembourgian male foil fencers
Luxembourgian male épée fencers
Olympic fencers of Luxembourg
Fencers at the 1948 Summer Olympics
Fencers at the 1952 Summer Olympics
Fencers at the 1956 Summer Olympics